The small Illgraben valley is one of the most geologically unstable regions of Switzerland, and is located south of Leuk in the Canton of Valais.

Geology and Geography 
The valley consists of triassic dolomite, porous limestone and quartzite, and due to intense weathering, the valley is well-known among geologists as a place to study processes like erosion, rockfall, debris and mud flows. Likewise, the Illgraben serves as a laboratory to test mudflow warning systems. The Swiss Federal Institute for Forest, Snow and Landscape Research uses radars, microphones and cameras to register mudflow events, and to warn the population of Leuk. Due to the unique geology, mudflows occur two to three times a year, while places threatened by mudflows usually experience only one every 30 to 40 years.

Several times a year, the Illgraben's mud flows cause the Rhône river to turn murky until it reaches Lake Geneva, which is 90 kilometers (56 miles) downriver. The Pfynwald (French: bois de Finges or forêt de Finges), a natural reserve and one of the largest continuous Scots pine forests of Europe, is located on the alluvial cone of Illgraben's stream, the Illbach. The Pfynwald itself is an important center for ecological studies.

Tourism 
A spectacular, north-easterly view into the Illgraben is possible from the hiking path Chandolin - Plaine Madeleine. From Susten (650 m,part of Leuk), hikers will first encounter the Bhutan bridge, a 134 meter suspension bridge, before seeing the valley's interior. From there, there is an unmarked trail to the aptly called Steinschlaghütte (English: rock fall hut), or to the alpine lake Illsee and the Illhorn.

Image gallery

Literature and further information 
 
 

Video documents by the Swiss Federal Institute for Forest, Snow and Landscape Research:
  French, with selectable English subtitles.
  Geologists visiting the Illgraben; explanations spoken in English.

References 

Valleys of Switzerland
Geology of Switzerland